Antill Plains Aerodrome was a World War II military aerodrome located  south of Townsville, Queensland, Australia. It takes its name from the nearby Antill Plains railway station, which takes its name from pioneer Edmund Spencer Antill, who established the Jarvisfield pastoral run in 1862. It is now at 1259 Old Flinders Highway, Oak Valley. It is often misspelled as Anthill Plains due to the termite mounds in the area (locally known as anthills).

The aerodrome was constructed in 1942, during World War II, for the Royal Australian Air Force as part of a group of airfields to be used as aircraft dispersal fields in the event of Imperial Japanese attack on the Townsville area. It was leased to the United States Army Air Forces.

The aerodrome had two runways, one running east–west and the other northeast–southwest. It was abandoned after the war. Today, the airfield is in regular use by the Barrier Reef Adventure Trikes (B.R.A.T.S) who fly their ultralights. There are numerous hangars and a model aero club at the end of runway 27. The airfield is now owned and operated by Andrew Hicks and is referred to locally as Montpelier Airpark. It is the closest ultra-light airfield to town of the three in the area.

Units based at Antill Plains Aerodrome
33rd Bombardment Squadron of the 22nd Bomb Group - (B-26 Marauder's) 7 April 1942 – 20 July 1942.

Aircraft crashes
 12 May 1942 - B-26 Marauder, Serial Number #40-1477 crashed on landing.

See also
 United States Army Air Forces in Australia (World War II)
 List of airports in Queensland

Notes

References

External links
OzatWar website
Pacific War Wrecks Database

Former Royal Australian Air Force bases
Airfields of the United States Army Air Forces in Australia
World War II airfields in Australia
Buildings and structures in Townsville
Defunct airports in Queensland
Airports established in 1942
1942 establishments in Australia
Queensland in World War II